Danielle Molendijk (born 10 december 1980) is a former Dutch short track speed skater. She was twice European Championships medalists in relays: bronze in 1999 and silver in 2001. During the 1998-99 season, she twice achieved the third place — in 3000m race in Zoetermeer and then in 1500m race in Székesfehérvár — thus becoming the first Dutch female short track speed skater reaching podium at the World Cup.

External links
Person Bio
Athlete's Results

1979 births
Living people
Dutch female short track speed skaters
20th-century Dutch women
21st-century Dutch women